Patrick Stefan Bernard Dybiona (born 12 September 1963 in Brunssum, Limburg) is a former freestyle swimmer from the Netherlands, who competed for his native country at the 1988 Summer Olympics in Seoul, South Korea.

There he finished in seventh place (3:46.55) with the Dutch 4 × 100 m medley relay team, alongside Hans Kroes (backstroke), Ron Dekker (breaststroke), and Frank Drost (butterfly). On his two personal starts, in the 100 m and 200 m freestyle, he ended up in 30th (51.79) and in 34th (1:52.67) position.

References
 Dutch Olympic Committee

1963 births
Living people
Dutch male freestyle swimmers
Olympic swimmers of the Netherlands
Swimmers at the 1988 Summer Olympics
People from Brunssum
European Aquatics Championships medalists in swimming
Universiade medalists in swimming
Universiade silver medalists for the Netherlands
Medalists at the 1987 Summer Universiade
Sportspeople from Limburg (Netherlands)